Fellodistomidae is a family of trematodes belonging to the order Plagiorchiida.

References

Plagiorchiida